Dhok Padhal (Urdu: ڈھوک پڈھال) is a village situated in Jhelum District, Punjab, Pakistan. This village was named in 1667 after the a shepherd and in Punjabi Language sheep's are called(phads) so people use to call this as "Village of Phads" so from there the name was derived as "Dhok Padhal"
This village is the based on Jutt tribes.

Geography
Lies 10 km west of Dina, 5 km north of Rohtas and 30 km north east of Tilla Jogian.

Castes

The principal castes are Jutt, Bhat Shah Tarkhaan Masali Nai.

External links
Dhok padhal map
school name
Geography

Populated places in Jhelum District
1767 establishments in India